Stephen Kent Yoder (born November 1, 1939) is an American former college basketball coach.  He served as the head men's basketball coach at Ball State University from 1977 to 1982 and the University of Wisconsin–Madison from 1982 to 1992, compiling career college basketball coaching record of 205–227.  Yoder most recently served as director of operations for the Houston Cougars men's basketball team.

Background
Yoder is a native of Plymouth, Indiana and 1958 graduate of Plymouth High School. He attended then NAIA-member Illinois Wesleyan University on a basketball and baseball scholarship winning four letters in baseball and two in basketball before graduating in 1962. He received his master's degree from University of Saint Francis, then called Saint Francis College, in Fort Wayne, Indiana in 1970.

Career
He started his coaching career at Glen Ellyn, Illinois junior high school, and in 1965 took an assistant's position in basketball at Plymouth, Indiana. He became head coach at Plymouth in 1967 and proceeded to guide the school to three conference titles, three sectional crowns, a pair of regional titles, and two finishes among the top ten teams in state rankings over a six-year period. Yoder was named Indiana's District One Coach of the Year in 1973 and he then accepted a job as assistant coach at Furman University. He returned to Indiana in 1975 as head coach at Mishawaka's Penn High School. He then became assistant basketball coach at Ball State University in 1976 and a year later became head coach at the school.

Yoder was head coach at Ball State from 1977–78 to 1981–82, compiling a record of 77-62. He was named the Mid-American Conference Coach of the Year for both the 1980–81 and 1981–82 seasons. The 1980-81 Ball State team shared the MAC title with three other schools and gained an NCAA tournament berth by winning the conference's post-season tournament. Ball State compiled an overall 17–11 record during the 1981-82 season including a 12–4 conference record that gave them the MAC championship. The Cardinals lost to Northern Illinois University 79–75 in overtime in the MAC post-season tournament title game with the winner advancing to the NCAA meet.

In 1982, he left for University of Wisconsin–Madison, where he coached the Badgers until 1992. He compiled a record of 128–165 and led the Badgers to the National Invitation Tournament in 1988–89 and 1990–91 – the Badgers' first postseason appearances in over 40 years. For his accomplishments in coaching the 18–12 NIT team in 1988-89, Yoder was named Kodak District XI Coach of the Year by the National Association of Basketball Coaches as well as Midwest Coach of the Year by Basketball Times. Yoder was forced to resign in February 1992, effective after the season.

After coaching, he became a scout with the Indiana Pacers and later the New York Knicks.

Awards
Yoder is a member of the Ball State University Hall of Fame (2001) and the Indiana Basketball Hall of Fame (2020).

Head coaching record

College

References

External links
 Houston profile

1940s births
Living people
American men's basketball coaches
American men's basketball players
Ball State Cardinals men's basketball coaches
Baseball players from Indiana
Basketball coaches from Indiana
Basketball players from Indiana
College men's basketball head coaches in the United States
High school basketball coaches in the United States
Houston Cougars men's basketball coaches
Illinois Wesleyan Titans baseball players
Illinois Wesleyan Titans men's basketball players
Indiana Pacers scouts
New York Knicks scouts
People from Plymouth, Indiana
University of Saint Francis (Indiana) alumni
Wisconsin Badgers men's basketball coaches